Kari Simonsen (born 5 June  1937) is a Norwegian actress. She made her professional stage debut at Folketeatret in 1959. She was appointed at Oslo Nye Teater from 1960 to 1972, and at Nationaltheatret from 1974. She has also played for radio and television, and had guest appearances at the revue stages Chat Noir and Edderkoppen. Simonsen is the mother of philosopher Herman Cappelen.

References

External links
 

1937 births
Living people
Norwegian stage actresses
Norwegian musical theatre actresses
Norwegian film actresses
Norwegian television actresses
20th-century Norwegian actresses
21st-century Norwegian actresses
Actresses from Oslo